Cuauhtémoc Velasco Oliva (born 8 June 1945) is a Mexican politician from the Citizens' Movement. From 2006 to 2009 he served as Deputy of the LX Legislature of the Mexican Congress representing the Federal District.

References

1945 births
Living people
Politicians from Mexico City
National Autonomous University of Mexico alumni
Citizens' Movement (Mexico) politicians
21st-century Mexican politicians
Deputies of the LX Legislature of Mexico
Members of the Chamber of Deputies (Mexico) for Mexico City